KQNG-FM (93.5 FM) is a radio station broadcasting a contemporary hit radio format. Licensed to Lihue, Hawaii, United States, the station serves the Kauai area. The station is currently owned by Pacific Media Group.

History
The station went on the air as KPOY on January 21, 1980. On October 21, 1982, the station changed its call sign to KIPO-FM and on March 31, 1987, to the current KQNG-FM.

References

External links
 KONG website

QNG-FM
Radio stations established in 1980
Contemporary hit radio stations in the United States